France has participated in the biennial classical music competition Eurovision Young Musicians 9 times since its debut in 1982. France won the contest in 1986, and hosted the most recent event in 2022 in Montpellier.

Participation overview

Hostings

See also
France in the Eurovision Song Contest
France in the Junior Eurovision Song Contest

References

External links 
 Eurovision Young Musicians

Countries in the Eurovision Young Musicians